Essex railway station (aka Old Michigan Central Station) is a railway station building in Essex, Ontario, Canada, constructed by the Michigan Central Railroad in 1887, and is now operated by a local heritage group, Heritage Essex Inc.

References

External links

Former Michigan Central Railroad stations
Disused railway stations in Canada
Railway stations in Canada opened in 1887
Railway stations in Essex County, Ontario